Coventry railway station is the main railway station serving the city of Coventry, West Midlands, England. The station is on the Birmingham loop of the West Coast Main Line (WCML); it is also located at the centre of a junction where the lines to Nuneaton and to Leamington converge. It is situated on the southern edge of the city-centre, just outside the inner ring road, about 250 yards to the south of junction 6.

Coventry station has regular services between London Euston and Birmingham New Street on the WCML. Other services are extended to/from Wolverhampton, Shrewsbury, Preston, Glasgow and Edinburgh Waverley. There are also long distance CrossCountry services to Manchester to the north and Oxford and Bournemouth to the south. Local services also operate between Coventry-Nuneaton, Northampton and Leamington Spa.

The station has the PlusBus scheme where train and bus tickets can be bought together at a saving.

History

The original station was built in 1838 as part of the London and Birmingham Railway and could be entered from Warwick Road, where two flights of stairs took the passengers down to the platform. Within two years it had been replaced, with a new larger station, a few hundred feet nearer to Rugby, this time, accessed via Eaton Road. In the late 19th century the Coventry tram network extended to the station at Eaton Road. The original station remained in service as the station masters offices, until the station was redeveloped in the early 1960s by the London Midland Region of British Railways.

The new 1840 station saw a significant number of modifications and extensions over the years, there was an engine shed, water column and turntable, in its later days an inclined walkway from the platform directly to Warwick Road for summer excursions, and a parcel depot formed from old carriages. However, the station was constrained by bridges at either end of the station, Stoney Road bridge to the south, and Warwick Road bridge to the north. The bridges effectively restricted the station to two lines, and prevented the platforms from being extended.

In 1881 the London and North Western company planned extensive alterations and improvements at an estimated cost of £12,000 to £13,000 to remedy the sitauation.  The up and down platforms were extended beyond the bridge and a new siding installed near Quinton Road. A new line of 2¾ miles was laid from Coventry to Wainbody Wood to ease congestion and delays on this branch line. The cutting opposite the signal box on the Leamington Line was widened and the stone bridge in Stoney Lane replaced with an iron girder one. An accident occurred during the installation of the iron girder bridge when as the iron girder was being lifted into position. The hook of the pulley holding the girder broke in two and the girder fell, smashing the wagons beneath. Fortunately there were no injuries, although many workmen had a lucky escape. 

In 1902 the London and North Western Railway company carried out some improvements at the station at a cost of £25,000. The contractor was Mr. Parnell of Rugby and the work was supervised by Mr. Brunsdon. The plan involved converting a garden rented by the station-master to utilise as a siding. The up platform was raised by 9 inches and extended 95 yards beyond the Stoney Road bridge. The interior of the station was extended to where the current entrance was, and the refreshment rooms, telegraph and other offices were built on the space formerly roof-in as a cab stand. The cab stand was planned to move further in the direction of Eaton Road. A foot bridge with lifts was provided between the up and down platforms The new booking office opened in February 1903. It was 25ft 9n by 27ft and in the centre of a new block of waiting rooms and offices. 

However, it proved inadequate for the growing business at the station. Work on expansion was due to start in 1914, but was delayed by labour shortages and the outbreak of the First World War. Work started in August 1915 on enlarging the booking hall. The new booking hall had a 60ft open frontage to the street with six booking windows, and extra entrances and exits to the up platform. The booking office was also much larger. The contractor was Mr. Heap of Northampton.

By 1935 the station needed additional facilities and a plan was prepared to provide a new island platform of 920 ft in length on the down Birmingham side at a cost of £70,000 to £80,000. Although the railway company had wanted a larger scheme of improvement, the full plan could not be delivered at this time, so the island platform was the first stage. Work did not start until early 1938 when the costs had risen to £100,000. The bookstall on the up platform was moved, rebuilt and equipped with electric light. A new electric lift was provided for the movement of luggage. The existing general and women’s waiting rooms, and the enquiry office were converted into new refreshment rooms. The construction of the island platform did not start until 1939 but was put on hold by the outbreak of the Second World War and never completed to the original LMS plans.

In the early 1960s both bridges were widened, and the old station finally demolished and re-built, this time with room for four platforms instead of two. At the time it was demolished in 1960, some parts of the old station were 120 years old. The station comprises a two-storey height booking hall with reinforced concrete frame, linked across an adjoining platform by a bridge to an island platform and a single sided platform. It was built to the designs of W R Headley, Regional Architect of the London Midland Region of British Railways and Derrick Shorten, the project architect. It was formally reopened on 1 May 1962. In 1995 it became a Grade II listed building.

The new station featured a new parcel depot, used to manage the large number of mail order catalogue packages coming into Coventry at the time. The depot was serviced by its own platforms from the Rugby end. The depot has now been replaced by a multi-storey car park, although some of the platforms and an electrification gantry remain.

A £91 million redevelopment of the station commenced in 2019 and was completed in 2022. The redevelopment consists of a new concourse, footbridge and a new multi-story car park. From the mid-2020s Coventry station is also planned to be served by the Coventry Very Light Rail system.

Motive power depot
The London and Birmingham Railway opened a small motive power depot at the west end of the station in 1838. This was replaced by a larger depot in the fork between the Leamington and Rugby lines, in 1866. This was enlarged in 1897 and rebuilt in 1957 but closed 17 November 1958 and was demolished. Locomotives were then serviced at the former Great Western Railway depot at Leamington Spa.

Services

The station is served by Avanti West Coast, CrossCountry and West Midlands Trains. In the past, it has also been served by Silverlink, but these routes were transferred to Central Trains in 2004. Central Trains and Virgin CrossCountry services were respectively transferred to London Midland and CrossCountry in 2007.

There is a small yard at the Birmingham end of the station, in front of the shopping centre that was once part of Coventry's yard, that is used by London Midland for the stabling of electric traction units, no heavy work is carried out at Coventry as that is done at either Soho TMD  (for Class 323s) or Northampton Siemens depot (Class 350s). All diesel units are stabled at Tyseley TMD where they are cleaned, maintained and refuelled. These units are only used on the local service to Nuneaton.

Until 2004, Coventry had a direct service to Nottingham via Leicester, but this was discontinued because Network Rail took away the ability for trains coming from Coventry to cross to the Leicester line at Nuneaton.

, the off-peak day time service pattern is: 
7 trains per hour to Birmingham New Street, of which 1 is CrossCountry Service, 3 are London Northwestern Railway service (every 20 mins) and the other 3 are Avanti West Coast (every 20 mins).
1 CrossCountry train per hour to Bournemouth via Southampton, Reading, Oxford and Leamington Spa 
1 CrossCountry train per hour to Manchester Piccadilly via Birmingham New Street and Stoke-On-Trent
1 train per hour to Liverpool via Stafford and Crewe
1 train per hour to Rugeley Town
1 train per hour to Blackpool North or Edinburgh Waverley via 
1 train per hour to Nuneaton via Bedworth
1 train per hour to Leamington Spa via Kenilworth

Service summary

Station facilities

In addition to the usual ticket office, the station has a travel centre for information, tickets for advance travel, ferry services, for rail passes, and other services.  Buses to Coventry city centre can be caught  from the station car park.

Stationmasters

Daniel McIver 1840 - 1864
William Stokes 1864- 1872
John Clench 1872 - 1880
Thomas Rivetts 1880 - 1888
Charles Toogood 1888 - 1896 (formerly station master at Kenilworth, afterwards station master at Stockport)
John Appleton 1896 - 1898
Thomas C. Baraclough 1898 - 1907
William Parsons 1907 - 1928
John Tompkins 1928 - 1934
E. Barnett 1934 - 1943 (formerly station master at Stockport)
Henry S. Turrell 1943 (afterwards station master at Carlisle)
A. Johnson 1943 - 1948 (afterwards station master at Leicester)
H.A. Went 1948 - 1951  (formerly station master at Bristol St. Phillip’s)
John Stanley Peck 1952 - 1955
Robert A. Slater 1955 - 1957
A.H. Kemp 1957 - 1959 (formerly station master at Wakefield Kirkgate)
Ronald Salt 1959 - 1966

References

An Historical Survey Of Selected LMS Stations Vol. One Dr R Preston and R Powell Hendry. Oxford Pub. Co. (1982, Reprinted in 2001)

External links

 A number of historic photographs of Coventry Station dating from 1838 to the rebuilding in 1962 can be seen at warwickshirerailways.com

Railway stations in Coventry
DfT Category B stations
Former London and Birmingham Railway stations
Railway stations in Great Britain opened in 1838
Railway stations served by CrossCountry
Railway stations served by West Midlands Trains
Railway stations served by Avanti West Coast
1838 establishments in England
Grade II listed buildings in the West Midlands (county)
William Robert Headley railway stations
Stations on the West Coast Main Line